This is a list of Italian football transfers for the 2009–10 season. Only moves from Serie A and Serie B are listed.

The winter transfer window will open for 4 weeks. Players without a club may join one, either during or in between transfer windows.

Winter transfer window

1Player officially joined his new club on 2 January 2010.
2Player officially joined his new club on 4 January 2010.

Out of window transfer

References
General
 Official Transfer List (Serie A)
 Official Transfer List (Serie B)
 Football-Italia.net Serie A transfer List
 Corriere dello Sport Serie A transfer List 
Specific

Italy
Trans
2009-10